Muscle contractures can occur for many reasons, such as paralysis, muscular atrophy, and forms of muscular dystrophy. Fundamentally, the muscle and its tendons shorten, resulting in reduced flexibility.
For example, in the case of partial paralysis (i.e. poliomyelitis) the loss of strength and muscle control tend to be greater in some muscles than in others, leading to an imbalance between the various muscle groups around specific joints.  Case in point: when the muscles which dorsiflex (flex the foot upward) are less functional than the muscles which plantarflex (flex the foot downward) a contracture occurs, giving the foot a progressively downward angle and loss of flexibility. Various interventions can slow, stop, or even reverse muscle contractures, ranging from physical therapy to surgery. A common cause for having the ankle lose its flexibility in this manner is from having sheets tucked in at the foot of the bed when sleeping. The weight of the sheets keep the feet plantarflexed all night. Correcting this by not tucking the sheets in at the foot of the bed, or by sleeping with the feet hanging off the bed when in the prone position, is part of correcting this imbalance.

It occurs also due to muscle tightening for example if after fracture when immobilization is done by putting plaster of paris the muscle length shortens because the muscle is not used for a large span of time.

Cause

Immobilization
Joints are usually immobilized in a shortened position resulting in changes within the joint connective tissue, and the length of the muscle and associated tendon. Prolonged immobilization facilitates tissue proliferation which impinges on the joint space. Maintaining a shortened position for a prolonged period of time leads to: fibrous adhesion formation, loss of sarcomeres, and a loss of tissue extensibility.

Spasticity
If spasticity is left untreated, contractures can occur. A loss of muscle tone inhibition causes a muscle to become hyperactive resulting in constant contraction, which reduces an individual’s control of the affected area.  The joint will remain in a flexed state producing similar effects as listed in immobilization.

Muscle weakness
A muscle imbalance between an agonist and antagonist muscle can occur due to a neurological disorder, spinal cord injury, and our lifestyle/postural habits. A decrease in muscle tone leads to continuous disuse and eventually muscular atrophy. The constant contraction of the agonist muscle with minimal resistance can result in a contracture.

Treatment

Passive stretching
Typically performed by physical therapists, passive stretching is a more beneficial preventative measure and tool to maintain available range of motion (ROM) rather than used as a treatment. It is very important to continually move the limb throughout its full range at a specific velocity but a passive stretch can’t be maintained for the period of time required for optimal benefit.

A 2017 Cochrane review found that stretching does not provide any short-term pain relief.

Splinting
A contracture corrective device (CCD) is a dynamic splint that provides a continuous stretch with a continuous force and operates based on the principles of creep. It is the most advantageous splint but more research is required. Splints are used in long term treatments and must be removed in order to stretch the antagonist muscle to maintain range of motion (passive stretching).

Electrical stimulation
Electrical stimulation improves passive range of motion but only temporarily. Once the treatment is withdrawn, all benefits are reduced.  It can play a critical role in muscle atrophy prevention.

Surgery
Surgery is a solution to muscle shortening but other complications may arise. Following muscle lengthening surgery, force production and ROM is usually reduced due to the shift in sarcomere locations between a muscle's maximal and minimal length. Shortening of the surgically lengthened muscle can re-occur.

References

Muscular system